College Hoops 2K7 is an American college basketball video game initially released on November 20, 2006 for the Xbox and Xbox 360 and released later for the PlayStation 2 (December 11) and PlayStation 3 (March 13, 2007). It is the 5th installment of the series, which began with NCAA College Basketball 2K3. It features former Duke JJ Redick on the cover. It is produced by 2K Sports. It is the first college basketball game for the PlayStation 3. Redick was a special correspondent to the development of the game and added his signature shot style in motion capture.

Every school competing in Division I NCAA College Basketball is included in 2K7, including D-1 transitional independents (such as New Jersey Institute of Technology). The game also features the ability to change and modify rosters.

Coaches Roy Williams, Lute Olson, Billy Donovan, John Calipari, Jay Wright, and Sidney Lowe lend their likenesses to the game. There is a preview show with hosts Greg Gumbel and Clark Kellogg.

Features
 325 Division 1 Teams 
 Enhanced Legacy Mode has updated selection Sunday, and over 31 In-season tournaments 
 Over 200 authentic collegiate Fight songs 
 Precision Passing has new animations and upgraded passing intelligence

Reception

The game was met with positive to average reception. GameRankings and Metacritic gave it a score of 82.48% and 82 out of 100 for the Xbox 360 version; 81.13% and 81 out of 100 for the PlayStation 3 version; 73.17% and 73 out of 100 for the Xbox version; and 68.40% and 69 out of 100 for the PlayStation 2 version.

References

External links
 
 Official 2K Sports College Hoops 2K7 site
 Official 2K Sports site for online leagues and tournaments
 Pontiac video games

2006 video games
2K Sports games
College basketball video games in the United States
PlayStation 2 games
PlayStation 3 games
Xbox games
Xbox 360 games
Multiplayer and single-player video games
Take-Two Interactive games
Video games developed in the United States
NCAA video games